is a Japanese jazz drummer.

Moriyama played piano as a child before switching to drums in his late teens. He then attended the Tokyo University of the Arts, taking a degree in percussion performance. He joined Yosuke Yamashita's small group in 1967, and went on several international tours with the group until leaving it in 1975. He moved to Nagoya in 1977 and began leading his own groups. In addition to Yamashita he has performed or recorded with Aki Takase, Akira Miyazawa, Fumio Itabashi, Masahiko Satoh, Peter Brötzmann, Nobuyoshi Ino, Takehiro Honda, and Manfred Schoof.

References

1945 births
Japanese jazz drummers
People from Yamanashi Prefecture
Musicians from Tokyo
Living people